Ana Felicia Filip (born 20 March 1959, Slatina) is a Romanian operatic soprano. She has sung in the Royal Opera House Covent Garden, the Vienna State Opera and the Liceu in Barcelona. Since 2014, she is the director of the Comic Opera for Children in Bucharest.

Awards
1983 Francisco Viñas Singing Contest Barcelona First Prize and Mozart Prize
1985 International Tchaikovsky Competition - Moscow Second Prize
1987 Belvedere International Singing Competitions - Vienna Second Prize, Mozart Prize and Japanese Prize
1991 "The Glory of Mozart" Singing Competition - Toronto First Prize

References

External links
 http://feliciafilip.wifeo.com Unofficial website

1959 births
Living people
People from Slatina, Romania
Romanian operatic sopranos
20th-century Romanian women opera singers
Prize-winners of the International Tchaikovsky Competition